Shah Jalal Dakhini was a 15th-century Sufi Muslim figure of Dhaka, eastern Bengal (now Bangladesh). Dakhini was one among the many Sufis who spread Islam in eastern India. Saint received an honorifics as a Dakhini as he was the resident of Deccan.

Biography
It is debated whether Dakhini was originally from the Deccan Plateau in South India (as his name suggests) or that he was from Gujarat in Western India. According to 'Abd al-Haqq al-Dehlawi's Akhbar-ul-Akhyar, Dakhini studied under Shaykh Piyara in North India. Piyara was a Bengali Muslim scholar of the Chishti Order.

One day, he set off with a few companions from Gujarat to eastern Bengal, during the reign of the Sultan of Bengal Shamsuddin Yusuf Shah. He established a khanqah in present-day Motijheel, Dhaka in order to propagate Islamic teachings to the local people. He gained a large following in Dhaka, so much so that it was seemingly proportionate to the power of a king. It is said he also started to have a very pompous attitude. According to legend, the Sultan was angered by this, viewing Dakhini as a threat, and so had Dakhini and his comrades executed in 1476. Dakhini and one of his disciples were both buried in a single-domed mazar (mausoleum) in two separate tombs. This is now found northeast of the Bangabhaban gateway.

Legacy 

Tradition holds that his tomb is within the Bangabhaban compound.

References

People from Dhaka
15th-century Indian Muslims
Bengali Sufi saints
1476 deaths
Gujarati people